Patricio Aylwin (1918–2016) was a Chilean politician.

Aylwin may also refer to:

Andrés Aylwin (1925–2018), Chilean politician
Guy Maxwell Aylwin (1889–1968), British architect
Harry Aylwin (1870–1949), Australian rules footballer
Horace Aylwin (1904–1980), Canadian sprinter
Jean Aylwin (1885–1964), Scottish actress
John Cushing Aylwin (1778–1813), American officer
Nigel Aylwin-Foster, British general
Thomas Cushing Aylwin (1806–1871), Canadian politician
Aylwin Lewis (born 1954), American businessman

Other uses 
Aylwin (film), British film
Aylwin-class destroyer, a list of U.S Navy destroyers
USS Aylwin, several United States Navy ships

See also
Alvin (disambiguation)